Abhidhammavatara (Pali, also Abhidhammāvatāra), according to Encyclopædia Britannica is "the earliest effort at systematizing, in the form of a manual, the doctrines dealt with in the Abhidhamma (scholastic) section of the Theravada Buddhist canon. According to Rupert Gethin, the Abhidhammāvatāra (‘Introduction to Abhidharma’) was "written in the fifth century by Buddhadatta, a contemporary of Buddhaghosa." Buddhadatta was a poet and scholar in the region of the Kaveri River, in southern India". He was patronised by Accutavikkante of the Kalamba family (Accut Accutavikkante Kalambakulanandane mahin samanusāsante āraddho ca samāpito-verse 3179 of Nigamanagātha, Vinayavinicchaya).

Buddhadatta used this work to sum up and give original systematization to other commentaries dealing with Abhidhamma. It is written in a chapter, verse format, with 24 chapters. The Abhidhammattha-sangaha has, in essence, superseded it.

References

5th-century works
Pali Buddhist texts
Abhidharma
Theravada Buddhist texts